Andersen's fruit-eating bat (Dermanura anderseni) is a bat species found in South America.

Taxonomy and etymology
It was described as a new species in 1916 by American zoologist Wilfred Hudson Osgood. The holotype had been collected in 1915 by "R. H. Becker" (likely Osgood's assistant Robert Becker) in Porto Velho, Brazil. The eponym for the species name "anderseni" is Danish mammalogist Knud Andersen. The classification of Dermanura and Artibeus has been a topic of debate, though there has been genetic and morphological evidence to reclassify the species as Artibeus aequatorialis.

Description
Its fur is dark brown on both its dorsal and ventral sides. Individuals weigh .
It has indistinct facial stripes.

Biology and ecology
It is one of relatively few species of bats that constructs "tents" out of leaves for roosting. It is likely frugivorous.

It is found in several countries in South America, including Bolivia, Brazil, Colombia, Ecuador, and Peru.

Conservation
As of 2016, it is evaluated as least concern by the IUCN.

References

Dermanura
Bats of South America
Bats of Brazil
Mammals of Bolivia
Mammals of Colombia
Mammals of Ecuador
Mammals of French Guiana
Mammals of Peru
Fauna of the Amazon
Mammals described in 1916
Taxa named by Wilfred Hudson Osgood